Arthur Jacob "Jake" Epp,  (born September 1, 1939) is a Canadian executive and former politician.

Life and career
Born into a Mennonite family in Manitoba, Epp was a high school history teacher in Steinbach, Manitoba before entering politics.  Jake Epp was first elected to the House of Commons of Canada as a Progressive Conservative  Member of Parliament (MP) in the 1972 election for the riding of Provencher, which was the home of Atomic Energy of Canada Limited's  Whiteshell Laboratories.

In the wake of the 1977 murder of Emanuel Jaques, Epp wrote to the National Gay Rights Coalition: "I would like to see what kind of support you have now after what has taken place in Toronto. What is needed is not protection for homosexuals, but for Canadians who are not deviant."

After the 1979 election, he served in the short-lived Cabinet of Joe Clark as Minister of Indian Affairs and Northern Development. As minister, he wrote the Epp letter, which instructed the Commissioner of the Yukon to abandon some of her powers and established responsible government in the Yukon. He retained his seat in the 1980 election despite the defeat of the Clark government and returned to the Opposition bench.

When Brian Mulroney led the Conservatives back to power in the 1984 election, he appointed Epp as his Minister of National Health and Welfare. At the Cabinet table, he was a vocal proponent that life begins at conception.  In the spring of 1988, the activist organization AIDS Action NOW! burned an effigy of Epp at Toronto City Hall to draw attention to his neglect of the AIDS epidemic.

In 1989, Epp became Minister of Energy, Mines and Resources. Epp retired at the 1993 election, and returned to private life. From 1993 until 2000, he was Senior Vice President and Vice President at TransCanada Pipelines Ltd.

Epp was one of the Tories who joined the Canadian Alliance when it was created in an attempt to attract Progressive Conservatives to the former Reform Party of Canada.

The Tory Mike Harris government appointed Epp to head a review of the ongoing cost over-runs and delays that plagued Ontario Power Generation's restart of the four "A" reactors at the Pickering Nuclear Generating Station.  The two other panel members were Peter Barnes and Dr. Robin Jeffrey.  The review's report was released on December 4, 2003 and attributed to blame for the project to management problems.

The election of the Ontario Liberal Party in 2003 delayed action on the Epp report.  The government of Dalton McGuinty appointed Epp to the Ontario Power Generation Review headed by John Manley to examine the future role of Ontario Power Generation (OPG) in the province’s electricity market, examine its corporate and management structure, and decide whether the public utility should proceed with refurbishing three more nuclear reactors at the Pickering nuclear power plant.
The report recommended proceeding with the restart Pickering "A" reactors 1, 2, and 3, sequentially. The report argued that the restart of units 2 and 3 would be contingent on whether "OPG will be able to succeed at the Unit 1 project."

The McGuinty government accepted the OPG Review Committee's recommendation and allowed the restart of reactor 1, which still underwent cost over-runs and delays.
In August 2005, the OPG Board of Directors announced that Units 2 and 3 would not be refurbished due to specific technical and cost risks surrounding the material condition of these two units.

In 2004, the McGuinty government made Epp Chairman of the Board of OPG.

Between 2005 and 2009 Epp served as Chancellor of Tyndale University College and Seminary in Toronto.

In 2010, Epp was appointed an Officer of the Order of Canada.

The AIDS Crisis 

Jake Epp played a significant role in allowing the AIDS crisis to grow unchecked by continuously ignoring pleas from community organizations to develop and implement a National AIDS Strategy. Beyond invitations for conversation, a blind eye was turned to AIDS activist protests as well. Anti-Jake Epp HIV/AID activism came to a head when activists from AIDS Action Now! in Toronto called attention to his neglect by burning him in effigy in Nathan Philips Square. Jake Epp's willful ignorance exacerbated the AIDS crisis in Canada and contributed to the growing number of AIDS-related deaths. Despite the desperate need for action, the government made no change until Epp was replaced by Perrin Beatty. Only then was there involvement in HIV-related matters at the federal level in Canada.

Electoral history

References

External links
 
 Jake Epp fonds, Library and Archives Canada

1939 births
Living people
Canadian Mennonites
Canadian Ministers of Health and Welfare
Members of the 21st Canadian Ministry
Members of the 24th Canadian Ministry
Members of the House of Commons of Canada from Manitoba
Progressive Conservative Party of Canada MPs
Members of the King's Privy Council for Canada
Officers of the Order of Canada
Canadian Ministers of Indian Affairs and Northern Development
Canadian university and college chancellors
People from Saint Boniface, Winnipeg
People from Steinbach, Manitoba
Politicians from Winnipeg